Cristina Pedroche Navas (born 30 October 1988) is a Spanish actress, presenter, TV reporter and model.

Biography
She was born on 30 October 1988 in Madrid, Spain. For a while she combined her studies in Business Administration and Management and Tourism at King Juan Carlos University with her work on television as reporter. She rose to fame in 2010 when she joined the daily comedy show Sé lo que hicisteis... on La Sexta as a TV reporter until 2011. From August 2011 to June 2012 she worked as a reporter in the daily comedy show Otra movida. In March 2010, she was on the cover of the Spanish FHM magazine.

In September 2012, she joined radio program Yu, no te pierdas nada as a collaborator, on Los 40 principales. In December 2013, she joined the daily TV comedy show Zapeando, hosted by Frank Blanco in La Sexta. In April 2014, Pedroche participated in the 'water war' segment of the show with Frank Blanco. Pedroche also used the show as a platform to raise awareness for ALS by participating in the Ice Bucket Challenge.

In December 2014 it was announced that she signed a golden parachute with media group Atresmedia She also hosted the 2014-2015 New Year's Eve's Twelve Grapes broadcast for La Sexta alongside Frank Blanco, wearing a much commented upon transparent dress. During this show she participated in a 'champagne war' with Frank Blanco, a new year play on the previous 'water war'. She made a performance in La que se avecina.

In 2015, she left Zapeando to join the fifth Spanish season of reality television game show Pekín Express, her first work as a solo host.

On 24 October 2015 she married Spanish chef David Muñoz.

On 31 December 2015 (alongside Carlos Sobera) and 31 December 2016 (alongside Alberto Chicote) she hosted the New Year's Eve's Twelve Grapes broadcast for the second and third year in a row, this time for Antena 3, and continued the previous year's sensation wearing a see-through dress. In 2016 she repeated as host of the sixth season of Pekín Express. From January, 2017 she hosts the talent show  Tú sí que sí, in La Sexta in 2017. She hosted the New Year's Eve's Twelve Grapes in 2018.

She was cast in Sin filtro, by Santiago Segura.

In April 2021, she was the host of Love Island España, the Spanish version of the British reality show and international franchise Love Island.

Works

TV programs

TV series

Short films

Music videos

Radio

References

External links

 
 

1988 births
Living people
Actresses from Madrid
Spanish women comedians
Spanish television actresses